Chelsea Ariane Surpris (born 20 December 1996) is an American-born Haitian footballer who plays as a right back who plays for Yzeure Allier in the French Division 2 Féminine and for the Haiti women's national team.

Playing career
Surpris played for the Dallas Sting club team in her youth, helping the team to win the 2011 USYSA and 2014 ECNL national championships. She played for the Nolan Catholic Vikings in high school, where she was the team's most valuable player in 2012 while also competing as a track and field athlete. In college, she played for the Texas Longhorns from 2015 to 2018. In total, she made 60 appearances, scoring 2 goals and recording 2 assists. In 2019, she played for the Dallas Sting in the WPSL.

Surpris was previously a member of the United States under-20 national team player pool. She has been capped for the Haiti women's national team, including an appearance in the 2020 CONCACAF Women's Olympic Qualifying Championship against the United States on 28 January 2020.

Coaching career
Surpris was appointed as an assistant coach for the Louisiana Ragin' Cajuns women's team on 24 October 2019.

Personal life
Surpris graduated from the University of Texas at Austin with a Bachelor of Arts degree in Human Dimensions of Organization and a minor in business.

References

External links
 

1996 births
Living people
Citizens of Haiti through descent
Haitian women's footballers
Women's association football fullbacks
Haiti women's international footballers
Haitian football managers
Female association football managers
Women's association football managers
People from Crowley, Texas
Soccer players from Texas
American women's soccer players
Texas Longhorns women's soccer players
FC Dallas (women) players
Women's Premier Soccer League players
United States women's under-20 international soccer players
African-American women's soccer players
American women's soccer coaches
Louisiana Ragin' Cajuns coaches
College women's soccer coaches in the United States
American sportspeople of Haitian descent
21st-century African-American sportspeople
21st-century African-American women